Barry Hartle (born 8 August 1939) is an English former footballer who played as an inside or outside left. Born in Salford, Greater Manchester he made over 300 appearances in the Football League between 1956 and 1971 before dropping into non-league football.

Career
Hartle was spotted by Watford while playing in a local park as a schoolboy and agreed terms as a junior in 1956. Making his league debut two years later in December 1958, Hartle became a key member of Watford's first-team squad, and was part of their side that won promotion from Division Four during their 1959–60 season.

Having impressed in the lower divisions, Hartle was signed by Division Two side Sheffield United for £2,750 in June 1960, but only made three competitive appearances during his first season with the Blades. However, following United's promotion to Division One Hartle began to feature more regularly, although still primarily used when other teammates were unavailable. It wasn't until the 1964–65 season that Hartle established himself in the first-team, playing in all but three of United's competitive fixtures that season.

A year later however, Hartle was sold to Carlisle United in July 1966 for £14,900, representing a large profit on Sheffield United's initial investment. Hartle only remained at Carlisle for just over a season, joining Stockport County in September 1967. From there Hartle moved to Oldham Athletic in June 1970 before, after making just over 300 career league appearances, dropping into non-league when he signed for Southport in July 1971. His career winding down, Hartle went on to play for Macclesfield Town, Buxton, Witton Albion and Hyde United before retiring in 1977.

Personal life
Born in Salford, Greater Manchester, Hartle attended Salford Grammar School. After his retirement from football, Hartle was employed as a postman and then later as a taxi driver.

References

1939 births
Living people
Footballers from Salford
English footballers
Association football forwards
Watford F.C. players
Sheffield United F.C. players
Carlisle United F.C. players
Stockport County F.C. players
Oldham Athletic A.F.C. players
Southport F.C. players
Macclesfield Town F.C. players
Buxton F.C. players
Witton Albion F.C. players
Hyde United F.C. players
English Football League players
National League (English football) players
People educated at Salford Grammar School
British taxi drivers